Angélique Duchemin (26 June 1991 – 29 August 2017) was a French professional boxer known as "La princesse des rings.". She won all 14 of her professional fights, including three by knockout, and was World Boxing Federation featherweight champion.

Career
Duchemin's father and brothers were boxers. She started training at the Perpignan boxing club at the age of 7. In 2012 she signed a professional contract with the Perpignan boxing club. She undertook her first professional fight in December 2012, beating Cindy Bonhiver on points. In 2013 she won matches against Lourdes Nunez, Cynthia Godbillon and Claudia Ferenczi before claiming the vacant French national super-featherweight title with a unanimous decision against Godbillon. After successfully defending her French title twice in 2015, she won the  European super-featherweight title in December of that year by defeating Maria Semertzoglou. In February 2017 she beat Taoussy L'Hadji to retain the title. The wins over Semertzoglou and L'Hadji were both by unanimous decision. A month after the L'Hadji fight, she defeated Ericka Rousseau by unanimous decision to win the vacant World Boxing Federation featherweight title in front of an audience of over 1,000. Rousseau announced her retirement after the match.

Duchemin became ill at her boxing club in Thuir on the evening of 28 August 2017, and was treated by cardiac massage before being taken to hospital in Perpignan. She died, seemingly of a pulmonary embolism on the morning of 29 August 2017. An autopsy determined that the cause of death was an edema in the brain resulting from a heart problem, and also that there was no evidence of either doping or brain damage. She founded the Boxing Club of Thuir. At the time of her death Duchemin was an undefeated French, European and world champion.

References

External links
 

1991 births
2017 deaths
French women boxers
Featherweight boxers
Sportspeople from Perpignan
European Boxing Union champions
Deaths from cerebral edema
20th-century French women
21st-century French women